United Nations Security Council Resolution 140 concerned admission of the Malagasy Republic (Madagascar) to membership in the United Nations. In the resolution, the Council recommended that the General Assembly approve the Republic's application for membership. The Council adopted Resolution 140 unanimously on June 29, 1960.

See also
List of United Nations Security Council Resolutions 101 to 200 (1953–1965)

References

External links
 
Text of the Resolution at undocs.org

 0140
History of Madagascar
 0140
1960 in Madagascar
 0140
June 1960 events